24 is a 2001 Czech thriller film directed by David Beránek, starring Barbora Seidlová and Martin Trnavský. It takes place during 24 hours and follows a man and a woman on the run on the Czech countryside. The film was released through Bontonfilm on 11 January 2001.

Cast
 Pavel Trnavský as Martin
 Barbora Seidlová as dívka
 Jiří Tomek as grandfather

References

External links
 

2001 thriller films
2001 films
Czech thriller films
2000s Czech-language films
Films set in the Czech Republic
Czech road movies
2000s road movies
2000s Czech films